Tim Maia is a 2014 Brazilian biographical drama film based on the book Vale Tudo - O Som e a Fúria de Tim Maia by Nelson Motta, about the life of Brazilian musician Tim Maia. It is co-written and directed by Mauro Lima, and starring Robson Nunes, Babu Santana, Alinne Moraes, Cauã Reymond, Valdineia Soriano, George Sauma and Tito Naville.

The film follows the trajectory of one of the most beloved and respected artists of Brazilian music, from his humble origins to the most successful period of his career as a performer, going through transitions like the trip he took to New York City without money and without speaking a word of English.

Cast

 Robson Nunes as Tim Maia
 Babu Santana as Tim Maia
 Alinne Moraes as Janaína
 Cauã Reymond Fábio
 Valdineia Soriano as Dona Maria
 George Sauma as Roberto Carlos
 Tito Naville as Erasmo Carlos
 Luis Lobianco as Carlos Imperial
 Laila Zaid as Susi
 Marco Sorriso as Cromado
 Ephraim Benton as Bengy
 Blake Rice as Max
 Michael Tomlinson as Mr O'Meara
 Charlie Covey as Doug
 John Reese as Cornelius
 Pollyanna Rocha as Patricia
 Joya Bravo as Aretha
 André Dale as Wellington
 Bryan Ruffo as Valcir Ribeiro
 Bernardo Mendes as Dito

References

External links

2014 films
2010s Portuguese-language films
2014 biographical drama films
Brazilian biographical drama films
Pop music films
Brazilian rock music films
Films shot in Rio de Janeiro (city)
Films shot in New York City
Films set in Rio de Janeiro (city)
Films set in New York City
Biographical films about musicians
Biographical films about singers
Cultural depictions of rock musicians
Cultural depictions of Brazilian men
2014 drama films
2010s English-language films
2014 multilingual films
Brazilian multilingual films